Tanur railway station (code: TANR) is a railway station in Malappuram district, Kerala and falls under the Palakkad railway division of the Southern Railway zone, Indian Railways.

Railway stations in Malappuram district
Railway stations opened in 1904